John Purvis Hawtrey (19 July 1850 – 17 August 1925) was an English amateur footballer who earned two caps for the national team in 1881 playing as a goalkeeper.

Career
His football career started with Remnants F.C. and he later played for Old Etonians, with whom he won the FA Cup in 1879.

His international appearances both came in 1881, against Wales and Scotland. England lost both games and Hawtrey conceded a total of seven goals.

Personal life
He was born at Eton College, where his father, the Reverend John Hawtrey, was master of the lower school. His younger brother was the actor, Sir Charles Hawtrey.

He was a tutor for a time and later, a journalist. He also wrote plays under the pseudonym John Trent-Hay.

He was married twice, first to Mary Harriot Siddons in 1885. Mary died in 1890 and he later married Emma Newton in 1896.

References

1850 births
1925 deaths
English footballers
England international footballers
Old Etonians F.C. players
People from Eton, Berkshire
Association football goalkeepers
Remnants F.C. players
FA Cup Final players